Trachypollia didyma is a species of small big predatory sea snail, a marine gastropod mollusk in the family Muricidae, the murex snails or rock snails.

Description

Distribution
This marine species occurs off Florida, Bermuda, Martinique and Guadeloupe

References

 Jensen, R. H. (1997). A Checklist and Bibliography of the Marine Molluscs of Bermuda. Unp. , 547 pp
 Garrigues B. & Lamy D. (2019). Inventaire des Muricidae récoltés au cours de la campagne MADIBENTHOS du MNHN en Martinique (Antilles Françaises) et description de 12 nouvelles espèces des genres Dermomurex, Attilosa, Acanthotrophon, Favartia, Muricopsis et Pygmaepterys (Mollusca, Gastropoda). Xenophora Taxonomy. 23: 22-59.

External links
 Schwengel, J. S. (1943). New marine shells from Florida. The Nautilus. 56(3): 75-78, pl. 7
 Radwin G. & D'Attilio A. (1972). The systematics of some New World muricid species (Mollusca, Gastropoda), with description of two new genera and two new species. Proceedings of the Biological Society of Washington. 85(28): 323-352.

Gastropods described in 1943
Trachypollia